The 2010 Andalucia Tennis Experience was a tennis tournament played on outdoor clay courts. It was the 2nd edition of the Andalucia Tennis Experience, and an International-level tournament of the 2010 WTA Tour. The event took place at the Club de Tenis Puente Romano in Marbella, Spain, from April 5 through April 11, 2010.

Entrants

Seeds

Rankings and seedings are as of March 22, 2010.

Other entrants
The following players received wildcards into the main draw:
 Estrella Cabeza Candela
 Kim Clijsters
 Virginia Ruano Pascual

The following players received entry via qualifying:
 Beatriz García Vidagany
 Simona Halep
 Laura Pous Tió
 Arantxa Rus
 Yvonne Meusburger (as a Lucky loser)

Champions

Singles

 Flavia Pennetta def.  Carla Suárez Navarro, 6–2, 4–6, 6–3
It was Pennetta's first title of the year and 9th of her career.

Doubles

 Sara Errani /  Roberta Vinci def.  Maria Kondratieva /  Yaroslava Shvedova, 6–4, 6–2

External links
Official website

 
Andalucia
Andalucia Tennis Experience
Andalucia